St. Mary's Church is a religious building belonging to the Church of England in the town of Edinburgh of the Seven Seas on the island of Tristan da Cunha, one of those that make up the British overseas territory of Saint Helena, Ascension and Tristan da Cunha in the Southern Atlantic Ocean.

The church is one of two churches on the island, the other being the St. Joseph's Catholic Church,

History 

The church was built in 1923, under the direction of Rev. Martin Rogers. It was opened in July of that year. In 1990 the church was renovated and extended.

See also 

 Demographics of Saint Helena, Ascension and Tristan da Cunha
 St. Mary Church

References 

Tristan da Cunha
Anglican church buildings in Africa
Churches completed in 1923
Buildings and structures in Edinburgh of the Seven Seas